Dasytinae is a subfamily of soft-wing flower beetles, beetles of the family Melyridae, historically sometimes treated as a separate family, "Dasytidae".

Description and distribution 
Dasytinae are typically small (<8 mm) and parallel-sided, with brownish to blackish integument (rarely metallic), and with or without a covering of short pubescence.

They are most common and diverse in xeric regions of North America (especially the genera Trichochrous and Listrus) and Central Asia.

References

External links 
 
 

Melyridae
Beetle subfamilies